The Vlachs (/ ) are a Romanian-speaking population group living in eastern Serbia, mainly within the Timok Valley. They are characterized by a culture that has preserved archaic and ancient elements in matters such as language or customs. Their ethnic affiliation is highly disputed, with some considering the Vlachs as an independent ethnic group while others consider them part of the Romanians.

History 
"Vlach" is a word of Germanic origin, originally used by the Germanic tribes to refer to the Romans. It would later be adopted by the Byzantine Empire, the Ottoman Empire and virtually all Slavs to refer to the Romance languages-speakers in the Balkans that remained following the various migrations into the area. These peoples never referred to themselves as "Vlachs", but as some variant of "Roman". Today there are several peoples that are still commonly referred to as Vlachs, these including the Vlachs of eastern Serbia.

There are hypotheses about an autochthonous origin of the Vlachs in the area in which they currently live. Researchers who promoted this idea include the researcher Atanasie Popovici, a native of the area. However, most researchers agree that the Vlachs of eastern Serbia originate from areas in present-day Romania and settled in land in which they live today as a result of migrations in the 18th and 19th centuries. These migrations occurred due to the difficult living conditions in Hungary, Moldavia and Wallachia. Strong migrations were recorded between 1718 and 1739 after the Austro-Turkish War of 1716–1718; during this time, eastern Serbia was part of the Banat of Temeswar. Migrations to eastern Serbia continued after this period, albeit on a smaller scale. More precisely, migrations were recorded in the periods of 1723–1725, 1733–1734, 1818 and 1834. These were directed to the settlements of Jošanica, Krepoljin, Laznica, Osanica, Ribare, Suvi Do, Vukovac, Žagubica ( or ). These migrations increased the number of houses in the area around the Homolje Mountains (or ) from 80 in 1718 to 155 in 1733. Furthermore, the two latter waves led to the foundation of the settlements of Bliznak, Breznica, Izvarica, Jasikovo, Krupaja, Milanovac and Sige.

Before the unification of Moldavia and Wallachia in 1859, the Vlachs in eastern Serbia were officially known as "Romanians". On the other hand, the country of Wallachia (the name of which was derived from "Vlach"), was known in Serbian as  / . Furthermore, in ethnographic studies of the 19th or early 20th century, the Vlachs of eastern Serbia were regarded as Romanians in an undisputed way. However, after 1859 and the formation of the first modern Romanian state, this practice was reversed, with the name of "Vlach" being imposed over on the community of eastern Serbia to break similarities with the Romanians; this was intensified after the creation of Yugoslavia.

Culture

Language 

The Vlachs speak a group of archaic Romanian varieties known as "Vlach" in Serbia.The Romanian language is not in use in local administration, not even in localities where members of the minority represent more than 15% of the population, where it would be allowed according to Serbian law. This is mostly because of the lack of teachers and because Vlach is more of an oral than a written language. Since 2012, there have been continuous efforts to standardize Vlach in a written form, and the teaching of Vlach has started in schools. While the Vlach standard written language is under development, the Vlach Council in Serbia in 2006 debated the use of Serbian as the official language and Romanian as the literary language. This proposition of the council was confirmed in a document it issued in 2010 – endorsing the Serbian language while written Vlach was being developed. In 2012, the council decided to adopt a proposition on written and oral Vlach and started to work towards its standardization. According to the Serbian census of 2011, among the 35,330 individuals who identified as Vlachs, 28,918 declared that they spoke Vlach, and 186 Romanian. Out of 43,095 individuals who declared that their mother tongue was Vlach, 28,918 declared their ethnicity as Vlach, 12,156 as Serb, 67 as Romanian, 174 as other, 1,150 who did not declare and 266 unknown.

Religion
The Romanian Orthodox Church in Malajnica, built in 2004, is the first Romanian church in eastern Serbia. Before its construction, Romanians in Eastern Serbia were not allowed to hear liturgical services in their native language. Most Vlachs of Eastern Serbia are Orthodox Christians who had belonged to the Serbian Orthodox Church since the 19th century. This changed on 24 March 2009, when Serbia recognized the authority of the Romanian Orthodox Church in Eastern Serbia and the confessional rights of the Vlachs.
	
The 2006 Serbian law on religious organizations did not recognize the Romanian Orthodox Church as a traditional church, as it had received permission from the Serbian Church to operate only within Vojvodina, but not in Eastern Serbia. At Malajnica, a Vlach priest belonging to the Romanian Orthodox Church encountered deliberately-raised administrative barriers when he attempted to build a church.

Vlach magic
The relative isolation of the Vlachs has permitted the survival of various pre-Christian religious customs and beliefs that are frowned upon by the Orthodox Church. Vlach magic rituals are well known across modern Serbia. The Vlachs celebrate the ospăț (hospitium, in Latin), called in Serbian praznik or slava. The customs of the Vlachs are very similar to those from Southern Romania (Wallachia).

Identity and ethnic classification 
The identity and ethnic classification of the Timok Vlachs is highly contested. The Serbian government considers the Timok Vlachs a distinct and independent group and rejects any conflation with the Romanians, citing census results and their right to self-identify with the minority of their choice. On the other hand, the Romanian government's position is that the Timok Vlachs are simply Romanians, that the split into "Romanian" and "Vlach" identities is artificial and that Serbia has failed to protect the minority rights of the Romanians.

These disputes also occur between the Timok Vlachs themselves. Two main groups stand out: an "anti-Romanian" group and another "pro-Romanian" group. The former regards Serbia as the homeland of the Timok Vlachs and rejects any connection to Romania, while the latter relates the Timok Vlachs and Romanian through elements such as language and often regards Romania as the homeland of the Timok Vlachs, although both agree on the need for the Serbian government to do more to protect the Timok Vlachs.

In 2009, during an interview for the Serbian newspaper Politika, Živoslav Lazić, the president of the council and mayor of Veliko Gradište, called the efforts by "some in Serbia" to prove that the Romanians and the Timok Vlachs are a separate minority as "xenophobic". He also argued that claims about Romanianization of the Timok Vlachs by Romania come from people whose real aim is the assimilation of the Timok Vlachs. In 2010, shortly before the first elections to choose the members of the Vlach National Council, Vlach politician Miletić Mihajlović accused the council of being pro-Romanian and of having as its main objective "transfer" the Vlachs into the Romanians, adding that Serbia was the homeland of the Vlachs. The new council elected in 2010 adopted an anti-Romanian stance. In 2012, the new president, Radiša Dragojević, stated that "Nobody has the right to ask Vlachs to declare themselves as Romanians", that "Vlachs consider Serbia their motherland" and that "We have no objections, nor any basis to turn to Romania, nor does Romania have any basis to make any demands on our behalf". According to Dragojević himself, according to the 23 members that corresponded to the council of the Timok Vlachs, only four were pro-Romanian. In 2018, a new Vlach council was elected, and the coalition Vlachs for Serbia won 22 of the 23 seats. Dragojević, president of the Vlach council and member of the coalition commented that their result was due to pro-Romanian Vlach political formations having either boycotted the elections or having run for the elections for the National Council of the Romanian National Minority instead.

Today there is a movement among some members of the Timok Vlachs to align themselves with Romania and identify themselves as part of the Romanian identity in Serbia. As of 2009, an estimated two to three thousand Timok Vlachs were attending secondary schools and universities in Romania. It has been said that the Serbian political elite might fear that part of these could return to Serbia with a Romanian national consciousness that could influence the rest of the Timok Vlachs. The Association of the Vlachs of Serbia ( / , ZVS) stands out for this. The ZVS has made claims such as that Romania is the motherland of the Timok Vlachs, that they speak Romanian and that Serbia tries to assimilate the Vlachs by referring to them in this way to separate them from the Romanian nation. The Vlach National Party is a Wlach political party in Serbia led by Predrag Balašević. The party claims that the Serbia is trying to manipulate the culture and history of the Vlachs and impose a "historical cultural construct" on them. It also blends the Timok Vlachs with the Romanians from Romania into the same group. Timoc Press is another pro-Romanian organization in the Timok Valley, funded by the Department for Romanians Everywhere of the Romanian government, which considers the Timok Vlachs and the Romanians a single nation, the former of which is being assimilated by the Serbs. Even so, there are anti-Romanian organizations. An example is the Vlach Democratic Party (VDS), whose president in 2012, Siniša Celojević, declared that "The Vlachs of Serbia are not, and will never be, members of the Romanian national minority", which Romania claims groups outside its borders to reinforce their historical continuity and national identity and that Romania takes advantage of the lack of minority rights for the Timok Vlachs to "infiltrate" among them. Celojević was a member of the Vlach National Council.

Legal status

The ethnonym is Rumâni and the community Rumâni din Sârbie, translated into English as "Romanians from Serbia". They are also known in Romanian as Valahii din Serbia or Românii din Timoc. Although ethnographically and linguistically related to the Romanians, within the Vlach community there are divergences on whether or not they belong to the Romanian nation and whether or not their minority should be amalgamated with the Romanian minority in Vojvodina.

In a Romanian-Yugoslav agreement of November 4, 2002, the Yugoslav authorities agreed to recognize the Romanian identity of the Vlach population in Central Serbia, but the agreement was not implemented. In April 2005, 23 deputies from the Council of Europe, representatives from Hungary, Georgia, Lithuania, Romania, Moldova, Estonia, Armenia, Azerbaïdjan, Denmark, and Bulgaria protested against Serbia's treatment of this population.

The Senate of Romania postponed the ratification of Serbia's candidature for membership in the European Union until the legal status and minority right of the Romanian (Vlach) population in Serbia is clarified.

Predrag Balašević, president of the Vlach party of Serbia, accused the government of assimilation by using the national Vlach organization against the interests of this minority in Serbia.

Since 2010, the Vlach National Council of Serbia has been led by members of leading Serbian parties (Democrat Party and Socialist Party), most of whom are ethnic Serbs having no relation to the Vlach/Romanian minority. Radiša Dragojević, the current president of Vlach National Council of Serbia, stated that no one has the right to ask the Vlach minority in Serbia to identify themselves as Romanian or veto anything. As a response to mister Dragojević's statement, the cultural organizations Ariadnae Filum, Društvo za kulturu Vlaha - Rumuna Srbije, Društvo Rumuna - Vlaha „Trajan“, Društvo za kulturu, jezik i religiju Vlaha - Rumuna Pomoravlja, Udruženje za tradiciju i kulturu Vlaha „Dunav“, Centar za ruralni razvoj - Vlaška kulturna inicijativa Srbija and the Vlach Party of Serbia protested and stated that it was false.

According to a 2012 agreement between Romania and Serbia, members of the Vlach community that choose to declare as Romanians will have access to education, media, and religion in the Romanian language.

Notable people 
 Bojan Aleksandrović, Romanian Orthodox priest in the Timok Valley
 Predrag Balašević, politician defending the identification of the Vlachs as Romanians
 Miletić Mihajlović, politician
 , singer of Serb and Vlach folklore
 Branko Olar, one of the best known singers of Vlach folklore from Eastern Serbia, originating from the village of Slatina near Bor
 Staniša Paunović, well-known Vlach folklore singer, originating from Negotin, from Eastern Serbia
 Dușan Pârvulovici, activist for the minority rights of the Vlachs and their right for education in the Romanian language
 Atanasie Popovici, activist and researcher
 , poet, translator and writer

See also 
 Romanians of Serbia
 Vlachs in medieval Serbia
 Vlachs of Croatia
 Aromanians in Serbia
 Romanian language in Serbia
 Romanians in Bulgaria

References

Sources

Further reading

Sorescu-Marinković, Annemarie. "The Vlachs of North-Eastern Serbia: Fieldwork and Field Methods Today." Symposia–Caiete de Etnologie şi Antropologie. 2006.
Sikimić, Biljana, and Annemarie Sorescu. "The Concept of Loneliness and Death among Vlachs in North-eastern Serbia." Symposia–Caiete de etnologie şi antropologie. 2004.
Marinković, Annemarie Sorescu. "Vorbarĭ Rumîńesk: The Vlach on line Dictionary." Philologica Jassyensia 8.1 (2012): 47–60.
Ivkov-Džigurski, Anđelija, et al. "The Mystery of Vlach Magic in the Rural Areas of 21st century Serbia." Eastern European Countryside 18 (2012): 61–83.
Marinković, Annemarie Sorescu. "Cultura populară a românilor din Timoc–încercare de periodizare a cercetărilor etnologice." Philologica Jassyensia 2.1 (2006): 73–92.

External links 
 Community of Vlachs of Serbia
 Maps of Vlachs in north-east Serbia
 History of the Romanians living on the South of the Danube (Romanian/Serbian)
 Vlach necropolises

 
Timok Valley
Ethnic groups in Serbia
Eastern Romance people